Cretacolor is an Austrian brand of writing instruments, specialized in art materials. The brand is owned by Brevillier Urban & Sachs.

Cretacolor today

Since World War II, the company concentrated on the development and production of high quality art pencils. In recent years, high lightfastness has become an issue of increasing importance to artists, and Cretacolor has been one of the first manufacturers launching ranges of lightfast color pencils with its AquaStick and Marino lines.

References

External links
Cretacolor homepage

Writing implement manufacturers
Pencil brands
Manufacturing companies of Austria
Pen manufacturers
Austrian brands